Philip V (238–179 BC) was king (Basileus) of Macedonia from 221 to 179 BC. Philip's reign was principally marked by an unsuccessful struggle with the emerging power of the Roman Republic. He would lead Macedon against Rome in the First and Second Macedonian Wars, losing the latter but allying with Rome in the Roman-Seleucid War towards the end of his reign.

Early life

Philip was the son of Demetrius II of Macedon and Chryseis. Philip was nine years old when his father died 229 BC. His elder paternal half sister was Apama III. Philips's great-uncle, Antigonus III Doson, administered the kingdom as regent until his death in 221 BC when Philip was seventeen years old.

Philip was attractive and charismatic as a young man. A dashing and courageous warrior, he was compared to Alexander the Great and was nicknamed beloved of the Hellenes because he became, as  Polybius put it, "...the beloved of the Hellenes for his charitable inclination".

After ascending to the throne, Philip V in the first year of his reign pushed back the Dardani and other tribes in the north of Macedonia.

The Social War

The Social War (220–217 BC) started, when the Hellenic League of Greek city states was assembled in Corinth at the instigation of Philip V. He led the Hellenic League in battles against Aetolia, Sparta and Elis. In doing so, Philip V was able to increase his own authority amongst his own ministers. His leadership during the Social War made him well known and respected within his own kingdom and abroad.

First Macedonian War (214–205 BC)

After the Peace of Naupactus in 217 BC, Philip V tried to replace Roman influence along the eastern shore of the Adriatic Sea, forming alliances or lending patronage to certain island and coastal provinces such as Lato on Crete. He first tried to invade Illyria from the sea, but with limited success. His first expedition in 216 BC had to be aborted, while he suffered the loss of his whole fleet in a second expedition in 214 BC.  A later expedition by land met with greater success when he captured Lissus in 212 BC.

In 215 BC Philip V signed the Macedonian–Carthaginian Treaty with Hannibal the Carthaginian general. Their treaty defined spheres of operation and interest, but achieved little of substance or value for either side. Philip V became heavily involved in assisting and protecting his allies from attacks from the Spartans, the Romans and their allies.

Rome's alliance with the Aetolian League in 211 BC effectively neutralised Philip's advantage on land. The intervention of Attalus I of Pergamum on the Roman side further exposed Philip's position in Macedonia. Philip was able to take advantage of the withdrawal of Attalus from the Greek mainland in 207 BC, along with Roman inactivity and the increasing role of Philopoemen, the strategos of the Achaean League. Philip and his troops sacked Thermum, the religious and political centre of Aetolia. His troops destroyed 2,000 statues and hauled away vast sums of treasure which included some fifteen thousand shields and suits of arms the Aetolians had decorated their stoas with. These shields were the armor taken from the enemies of the Aetolians during their previous military victories and included the shields of the Gauls who had raided Greece in the 3rd century BC. 

Philip V took immense sums of gold and treasures and then burned down temples and public buildings of the Aetolians. Philip was able to force the Aetolians to accept his terms in 206 BC. The following year he was able to conclude the Peace of Phoenice with Rome and its allies.

Expansion in the Aegean

Following an agreement with the Seleucid king Antiochus III to capture Egyptian held territory from the boy king Ptolemy V, Philip invaded their territories in Asia Minor, besieging Samos and capturing Miletus. This expansion of Macedonian influence created alarm in a number of neighbouring states, including Attalid Pergamum and Rhodes. Philip responded by ravaging Attalid territory and destroying the temples outside the walls of Pergamon. Their navies clashed with Philip's off Chios and Lade (near Miletus) in 201 BC. Philip then invaded Caria. Although the Rhodians and Attalids successfully blockaded his fleet at Bargylia, they nevertheless sent an appeal to the Romans for help. At around the same time, the Romans finally defeated Carthage. Although very little in Philip's recent actions in Thrace and Asia Minor could be said to concern the Roman Republic directly, the Senate passed a decree supporting Pergamum and Rhodes and Marcus Valerius Laevinus was sent to investigate. Simultaneously, Philip's relationship with Athens suddenly deteriorated. The Acarnanian League launched a raid on Attica, aided by troops which they had received from Philip V. Attalus I and Rhodes convinced the Athenians to declare war on Macedon and Philip dispatched a force of 2,000 infantry and 200 cavalry under the command of Philokles to invade Attica and place the city of Athens under siege.

Second Macedonian War

In light of reports from Laevinus and further embassies from Pergamon, Rhodes, and Athens, Publius Sulpicius Galba one of the consuls for 200 BC was tasked with resolving the troubles in Macedonia. He organised a formal declaration of war in March, then recruited troops, and crossed the Adriatic in autumn. Meanwhile, Philip was besieging Abydos in the Hellespont. During the siege of Abydos, in the autumn of 200 BC, Philip was met by Marcus Aemilius Lepidus, a Roman ambassador on his way back from Egypt, who urged him not to attack any Greek state or to seize any territory belonging to Ptolemy and to go to arbitration with Rhodes and Pergamon. Philip protested that he was not in violation of any of the terms of the Peace of Phoenice, but in vain. As he returned to Macedonian after the fall of Abydos, he learnt of the landing of Sulpicius' force in Epirus.

Campaigns against Sulpicius
Gaius Claudius Centho was sent with 20 ships and 1,000 men to aid the Athenians, then led a surprise raid on the city of Chalcis in Euboea, one of the key Antigonid strongholds known as the 'fetters of Greece'. Philip rushed to Chalcis with a force of 5,000 men and 300 cavalry. Finding that Claudius had already withdrawn, he sped on towards Athens, where he defeated the Athenian and Attalid troops in a battle outside the Dipylon Gate and encamped at Cynosarges, made a series of unsuccessful assaults on Eleusis, Piraeus, and Athens. Then he ravaged the sanctuaries throughout Attica and withdrew to Boeotia. The damage to the rural and deme sanctuaries of Attica was severe and marked the permanent end of their use.

Over the winter of 200-199 BC, the diplomatic efforts of Philip, Sulpicius, and the Athenians centred on the Aetolian League, which seemed inclined to support the Romans but remained neutral at this stage. In the spring, Sulpicius and the Dardanians separately invaded Upper Macedonia,  while the Aetolian League joined the war on the Roman side and invaded Magnesia and Perrhaebia, then continued to ravage Thessaly. There, Philip suddenly appeared and completely defeated their force. He spent some time besieging the Aetolian city of Thaumaci, but gave up and withdrew as winter approached. He spent the winter training his army and engaging in diplomacy, particularly with the Achaean League.

Campaigns against Flamininus
Publius Villius Tappulus replaced Sulpicius in command, but spent most of the year dealing with a mutiny. In summer 198 BC Philip marched west and encamped on both sides of the Aoös river where it passed through a narrow ravine. Villius marched to meet him, but was still considering what to do when he learnt that his successor, Titus Quinctius Flamininus was on his way to Corcyra to assume command. At a peace conference, Flamininus announced the Romans' new peace terms. Up to this point, the Romans had merely ordered Philip to stop attacking the Greek cities. Now Flamininus demanded that he should make reparations to all the Greek cities he had harmed and withdraw all his garrisons from cities outside Macedonia, including Thessaly, which had been part of the Macedonian kingdom continuously since 353 BC. Philip stormed out of the meeting in anger and Flamininus decided to attack. In the subsequent Battle of the Aous, the Macedonian force collapsed and fled, suffering 2,000 casualties. Philip gathered up the survivors and retreated to Thessaly and then to Tempe.

Over the winter of 198/197 BC, Philip declared his willingness to make peace. The parties met at Nicaea in Locris in November 198 - Philip sailed from Demetrias, but he refused to disembark and meet Flamininus and his allies on the beach, so he addressed them from the prow of his ship. To prolong the proceedings, Flamininus insisted that all his allies should be present at the negotiations. He then reiterated his demands that Philip should withdraw all his garrisons from Greece, Illyria, and Asia Minor. Philip was not prepared to go this far and he was persuaded to send an embassy to the Roman Senate. When this embassy reached Rome, the Senate demanded that Philip surrender the "fetters of Greece," Demetrias, Chalcis, and Corinth, but Philip's envoys claimed they had no permission to agree to this, so the war continued. Over the rest of the winter, Philip mobilised all the manpower of his kingdom, which amounted to 18,000 men. To these he added 4,000 peltasts from Thrace and Illyria, and 2,500 mercenaries. All these forces were gathered at Dion. 

In June 197 BC, Flamininus marched north through Thermopylae, with allies from Aetolia, Gortyn, Apollonia, and Athamania. Philip marched south into Thessaly and the two armies met at the Battle of Cynoscephalae. In what proved to be the decisive engagement of the war, the legions of Flamininus defeated Philip's Macedonian phalanx. Philip himself fled on horseback, collected the survivors, and withdrew to Macedonia. Philip was forced to sue for peace on Roman terms.

Peace treaty with Rome
In 196 BC Philip V signed a peace treaty with the Romans. As per the treaty, Philip V could no longer harvest timber on the territory under his control. This effectively meant he could not build up an arsenal of weapons, such as large naval vessels.

Following the peace treaty, Philip cooperated with the Romans and provided material support for their wars against the Spartans under Nabis in 195 BC. Philip V also supported the Romans against Antiochus III the Great and the Aetolian League. After the Roman–Seleucid War the Romans allowed Philip V to keep territory he had conquered, such as Demetrias, the Magnesian coastline of Thessaly, parts of Athamania, parts of Dolopia, parts of Perrhaebia, and a number of towns in the Malian Gulf.

Internal reforms

Philip V was able to generate revenue by imposing taxes on the population of Macedonia and the exploitation of royal property, including mining, forestry and agriculture. According to the Roman historian Livy, less than half of the tributum paid to Philip V was passed on to Rome after 168 BC. Following the Second Macedonian War, Philip V increased his revenues from agriculture and mines. Philip focused on consolidating power within Macedonia. He reorganised the country's internal affairs and finances. Mines were reopened, and a new currency was minted.

Final years
However, Rome continued to be suspicious of Philip's intentions.  Accusations by Macedon's neighboring states, particularly Pergamon, led to constant interference from Rome.  Feeling the threat growing that Rome would invade Macedon and remove him as king, he tried to extend his influence in the Balkans by force and diplomacy. However, his efforts were undermined by the pro-Roman policy of his younger son Demetrius, who was encouraged by Rome to consider the possibility of succession ahead of his older brother, Perseus.  This eventually led to a quarrel between Perseus and Demetrius which forced Philip to decide reluctantly to execute Demetrius for treason in 180 BC. This decision had a severe impact on Philip's health and he died a year later at Amphipolis.

He was succeeded by his eldest son Perseus, who ruled as the last king of Macedon.

References

Sources

Primary sources
 Polybius, Histories, Evelyn S. Shuckburgh (translator); London, New York. Macmillan (1889); Reprint Bloomington (1962).

Secondary sources
 
 

3rd-century BC births
238 BC births
179 BC deaths
3rd-century BC Macedonian monarchs
2nd-century BC Macedonian monarchs
Ancient Macedonian monarchs
2nd-century BC rulers in Europe
3rd-century BC rulers
First Macedonian War
Second Macedonian War
3rd-century BC Greek people
2nd-century BC Greek people
Antigonid dynasty